Jack Tate is a businessman and former Republican legislator in the U.S. State of Colorado. He served both in the state house and state senate. He represented Senate District 27 in the Denver Metro Area, which encompasses parts of unincorporated Arapahoe County, the City of Centennial, and the town of Foxfield. While in the Colorado Senate, he served as Chair of the Senate Committee on Business, Labor, and Technology. He was also a member of the Senate Finance Committee and the Joint Technology Committee, the Pension Reform Commission, the Statutory Revision Committee, the Opioid and Other Substance Use Disorders Interim Study Committee, and the Alternatives to the Gallagher Amendment Interim Study Committee.

Early life 
Tate was born and raised in Nashville, Tennessee. He attended Duke University and graduated with a Bachelor of Science Degree in Engineering. He continued his education at Vanderbilt University, the University of Missouri, and the University of Colorado, Denver, attaining a Masters of Science in Finance, and an MBA in Marketing. He spent his 25-year career developing, evaluating, and managing projects related to capital investment.

Colorado House of Representatives
Tate was a Republican member of the Colorado House of Representatives, representing District 37 from 2014 until his appointment to the state Senate in 2016.

2014 primary and election
Tate defeated fellow Republican Michael Fields in a primary election that took place on June 24, with 65.7% of the vote.

In the general election for the Colorado House of Representatives on November 4, 2014, he defeated Democrat Nancy Cronk with 58% of the vote to win District 37.

2015 Legislative Session

For the 2015 legislative session, Tate was a member of the House State, Veterans, and Military Affairs Committee, the House Business Affairs and Labor Committee, and the General Assembly Joint Technology Committee. Tate was the prime sponsor of 12 Bills, of which 5 became law and one was vetoed.

 HB15-1197 modified limitations on liability obligations in public construction contracts. The new law provided that public entities may not ask design professionals to defend them in lawsuits unless the design professionals are found negligent.

Colorado State Senate

2015 Appointment
In October 2015, Colorado Senator, David Balmer, announced plans to resign. On December 12, 2015, Republican leaders in District 27 voted Tate as Balmer's replacement.

2016 Legislative Session
For the 2016 Legislative session, Tate was appointed to the Business, Labor, & Technology Committee, the Local Government Committee, and the Joint Technology Committee.

Tate introduced 34 bills during the 2016 session and 25 of the bills became law.

2017 Legislative Session 

For the 2017 Legislative session, Tate was the Chair of the Business, Labor & Technology Committee. He also became a member of the Finance and Statutory Revision Committees. Senator Tate introduced 44 bills during the 2017 session and 33 of the bills became law.

2018 Legislative Session 

For the 2018 Legislative session, Tate introduced 40 bills during the 2018 session and 33 of the bills became law.

2019 Legislative Session 

Tate introduced 31 bills during the 2019 session and 22 of the bills became law.

2020 Legislative Session 

Tate introduced 40 bills during the 2020 session and 27 of the bills became law.

References

External links
Official legislative website

1967 births
Living people
Republican Party members of the Colorado House of Representatives
Republican Party Colorado state senators
21st-century American politicians